The Coward (Spanish: El cobarde)  is a 1939 Mexican war film directed by René Cardona and starring Julián Soler, Adria Delhort and Josefina Escobedo.

Story

Alberto (Soler) is born in the imaginary republic of Sucravia (a country much like Mexico) in time of war, where his father dies a hero's death. He grows up as an effeminate lover of music. His mother (Delhort) sends him to the military college. There, Fernando (Aldás) bullies him, but gradually they become friends. A second war breaks out, and Alberto tries to avoid danger. If he is to change his life, he must face his fear.

Reception

The New York Times, reviewing the film in 1939, describes El Cobarde as "likely to keep the spectators guessing until the last reel". In their reviewer's opinion, Cardonas combines some psychology with "considerable talk about the now generally discredited theory of prenatal influence", a mother's genuine pride in her son, and a gentle romance. Soler, says the reviewer, plays the "vacillating" son of a hero well, and Delhort is "excellent as the Spartan mother" intent on preserving the family tradition of patriotic bravery. Escobedo and the supporting cast ably play mainly comic roles.

Cast
 Julián Soler as Capitán Alberto Anzures
 Adria Delhort as Doña Amalia
 Josefina Escobedo as Leonor
 Antonio R. Frausto as Juancho
 Lita Enhart as Elvira
 Luis Aldás as Fernando
 Joaquín Coss as Director del colegio
 Dolores Camarillo as Pancha
 Ángel T. Sala as Sargento Rocha
 Ricardo Mondragón as General
 Arturo Soto Rangel as Doctor
 Gustavo Carrillo as General
 Narciso Busquets as Alberto (niño)
 Isa Gary as Rosa
 Isauro Ruiz as Sargento
 Julio Ahuet as Soldado
 Roberto Cañedo as Minor Role
 Manuel Dondé as Minor Role

References

Bibliography 
 Elena, Alberto. El cine del tercer mundo: diccionario de realizadores. Turfan, 1993.

External links 
 
 Trailer at La Vanguardia

1939 films
1939 war films
Mexican war drama films
1930s Spanish-language films
Films directed by René Cardona
Mexican black-and-white films
1930s Mexican films